The Pietraroia Plattenkalk is a Cretaceous geologic formation located in the Italian municipality of Pietraroja, near Benevento, in Campania region. It is of Albian age. Dinosaur remains diagnostic to the genus level are among the fossils that have been recovered from the formation and the type locality of the formation is the La Cavere quarry, which is near the village of Pietraroja.

Paleofauna

Mollusca

Crustaceans

Fish

Amphibians

Lepidosaurs

Crocodylomorpha

Dinosaurs

Paleoflora

Algae

Plants

See also 
 List of dinosaur-bearing rock formations
 List of stratigraphic units with few dinosaur genera

References

Bibliography 
  

Geologic formations of Italy
Lower Cretaceous Series of Europe
Cretaceous Italy
Albian Stage
Limestone formations
Lagerstätten
Fossiliferous stratigraphic units of Europe
Paleontology in Italy
Province of Benevento